David Onllwyn Brace (1848 - 1891) was a Welsh Independent minister and elegist.  On completing his early schooling (probably in the Onllwyn area), he attended the Independent College, Bala (1866-9), and on 24 October 1870 was ordained priest in Rhos-y-Medre, Denbighshire. In 1872 he moved to the Swansea Valley and held appointments in Felindre and at Bethel, Llan-Twrch, before moving to  Bethel, Aberdare.

His published works include; 'Cerddi Onllwyn' (1888), and a volume of love-songs, 'Rachel' (1890).

He died in June 1891.

References 

Welsh religious leaders
1848 births
1891 deaths